Death of the Virgin is a 1460–65 painting by Petrus Christus.

References

1460s paintings
Paintings by Petrus Christus
Paintings in the collection of the Timken Museum of Art
Paintings of people